Pediasia dolicanthia is a moth in the family Crambidae. It is found in China (Xizang).

References

Moths described in 2004
Crambini
Moths of Asia